Calopotosia is a genus of flower chafers, scarab beetles in the subfamily Cetoniinae. Species are found in Asia.

Calopotosia elegans Kometami, 1938 is a synonym for Protaetia elegans.

References

External links 

 
 Calopotosia at insectoid.info

Scarabaeidae genera
Cetoniinae